Cinescape - Kuwait National Cinema Company (KNCC), formerly known as Kuwait Cinema Company, is a movie theater chain and film distributor in Kuwait. The company was incorporated in 1954 with a capital of 7 million rupees, a few years before the Kuwaiti dinar currency was introduced. Commencing in 1996, KNCC used modern shopping centers for multi-screen theaters and initiated a plan to renovate older theaters in an effort to enhance its corporate image. In November 2003, KNCC had introduced the first e-ticketing service in the Middle East.

Exhibition
Cinescape has 11 locations with 56 screens using Digital Cinema Technology, and has 3D capabilities.  It owns the second IMAX theater, which is located at Cinescape 360, while the first one is in The Scientific Center of Salmiya.  All of the theaters are located inside various malls except for one location which is a stand-alone cinema. The capacity level is around 12,000 seats across all locations.  There are also six VIP screens, with two in Cinescape the Avenues, two in Cinescape 360 and 2 in Cinescape Sharqia. Cinescape also launched premium offerings for Cinescape Al Kout.

Distribution
Cinescape plays a major role in distribution of major independent films in the Middle East through its associates, Front Row Filmed Entertainment. In 2005, The Kuwait National Cinema Company joined alliance with Front Row Filmed Entertainment distributing major independent films from studios like New Line Cinema, Paramount Vantage, Exclusive Media Group HanWay Films, Lakeshore Entertainment, Studio Canal, TF1 International, Celluloid Dreams, Peace Arch Films, Wild Bunch, Studio Ghibli, National Lampoon's and many more. Since then, more than 600 titles have been distributed across the Middle-East region. In addition to the Independent titles, it is a distributor of Arabic language films in the Persian Gulf region. It also distributes films from Bollywood, and foreign language titles to the GCC region.

Theaters
Cinescape Theatres
Cinescape 360
Cinescape The Avenues 
Cinescape Fanar 
Cinescape Al Kout
Cinescape Ajial 
Cinescape Albairaq
Cinescape Marina
Cinescape Sharqiah
Cinescape Muhallab
Cinescape Laila
Cinescape Plaza
Cinescape 1954 Film House
Cinescape Al-Assima

Upcoming Cinema Theatres
Cinescape Al Khiran

Kuwait Stock Exchange
KNCC has been listed on the Kuwait Stock Exchange as a shareholding company with assets valued at more than KD 36 million (US $122 million)

Management
Chairman - Abdulwahab Al Marzouq
Vice Chairman - Hisham Al Ghanim
CEO - Naser Al Rowdan

References

Cinema chains in Kuwait
1954 establishments in Kuwait
Entertainment venues in Kuwait